The 1966 New Zealand gallantry awards were announced via a special honours list dated 5 September 1966, and recognised four New Zealand military personnel for gallant and distinguished services in operations in South Vietnam.

Order of the British Empire

Member (MBE)
Military division
 Warrant Officer Second Class Malcolm Charles Nabbs – Royal New Zealand Artillery (Regular Force); of Waiouru.

British Empire Medal (BEM)
Military division
 Staff Sergeant Graeme Buxton Black – Royal New Zealand Artillery (Regular Force); of Hamilton.

Military Cross (MC)
 Captain Bruce Augustine Murphy – Royal New Zealand Artillery (Regular Force); of Papakura.

Mentioned in despatches
 Lance Bombardier Douglas Thomas Arthur Morrow – Royal New Zealand Artillery (Regular Force); of Taihape.

References

Gallantry awards
New Zealand gallantry awards